The 1998–99 Czech 2. Liga was the sixth season of the 2. česká fotbalová liga, the second tier of the Czech football league.

League standings

Top goalscorers

See also 
 1998–99 Czech First League
 1998–99 Czech Cup

References

 Official website 
 RSSSF

Czech 2. Liga seasons
Czech
2